Regency Hotel may refer to many hotels:
 Hyatt Regency, a hotel brand owned by Hyatt Hotels Corporation, some of which members feature revolving restaurants
 Loews Regency hotels owned by Loews Hotels:
 Loews Regency New York, in New York City
 Loews Regency San Francisco, in San Francisco
 The Regency, Denver, also known as "Regency Student Housing", in Colorado, USA, a student housing community which replaced the Regency Hotel
 The Regency Hotel, Dublin. Since renamed the Bonnington, it was the scene of the killing of David Byrne
 The Regency Palace, Amman. The hotel opened in 1982.